Irina Skripnik (born 26 January 1970) is a Belarusian cross-country skier. She competed at the 1998 Winter Olympics and the 2002 Winter Olympics.

References

External links
 

1970 births
Living people
Belarusian female cross-country skiers
Olympic cross-country skiers of Belarus
Cross-country skiers at the 1998 Winter Olympics
Cross-country skiers at the 2002 Winter Olympics
Sportspeople from Tula, Russia